Erika Kirsner (born 23 December 1975 in Hódmezővásárhely) is a former Hungarian international handball player who currently serves as the president of Váci NKSE.

Achievements
Nemzeti Bajnokság I:
Winner: 2000, 2002, 2007
Silver Medalist: 2001, 2003, 2006
Bronze Medalist: 2004, 2005
Magyar Kupa:
Winner: 2001, 2003
Silver Medalist: 2007
Women Handball Austria:
Winner: 2008, 2009, 2010
ÖHB Cup:
Winner: 2008, 2009, 2010
EHF Champions League:
Finalist: 2002, 2008
Semifinalist: 2009
EHF Cup:
Winner: 2006
World Championship:
Silver Medalist: 2003
European Championship:
Winner: 2000

References

External links
 Profile on Handball.hu

1975 births
Living people
People from Hódmezővásárhely
Hungarian female handball players
Olympic handball players of Hungary
Handball players at the 2004 Summer Olympics
Expatriate handball players
Hungarian expatriate sportspeople in Austria
Sportspeople from Csongrád-Csanád County